Thomas or Tom(my) Lynch may refer to:

Politics
Thomas Lynch (statesman) (1727–1776), South Carolina delegate to the Continental Congress
Thomas Lynch Jr. (1749–1779), signer of the Declaration of Independence
Thomas Lynch (congressman) (1844–1898), United States congressman from Wisconsin
Thomas Lynch (governor) (1603–1684), Governor of Jamaica
Thomas C. Lynch (1904–1986), California state attorney general, 1964–1971
Thomas Lynch (mayor), mayor of Galway
Thomas K. Lynch (born 1947), American municipal administrator and politician in Barnstable, Massachusetts

Sports

Baseball
Thomas Lynch (baseball executive) (1859–1924), American baseball umpire and National League president
Thomas Lynch (pitcher) (1863–1903), American baseball pitcher for Chicago during the 1884 season
Tom Lynch (baseball) (1860–1955), American baseball outfielder for Wilmington and Philadelphia during the 1884 and 1885 seasons

Football (soccer)
Thomas Lynch (footballer) (1907–1976), Welsh football goalkeeper
Tom Lynch (soccer), American soccer midfielder 
Tommy Lynch (footballer) (born 1964), Irish former footballer

Rugby
Tom Lynch (rugby union) (1892–1950), New Zealand rugby union footballer, father of the below
Thomas Lynch (rugby, born 1927) (1927–2006), New Zealand rugby union and rugby league footballer, son of the above
Tom Lynch (rugby league), rugby league footballer of the 2010s

Other
Tom Lynch (American football) (born 1955), former American football guard
Tom Lynch (Australian footballer, born 1990), Australian rules footballer for Adelaide, formerly St Kilda
Tom Lynch (Australian footballer, born 1992), Australian rules footballer for Richmond, formerly Gold Coast

Others
Thomas Lynch (admiral) (born 1942), retired American Navy rear admiral
Thomas J. Lynch (1916–1944), American World War II flying ace
Thomas Lynch (criminal) (18??–1914), see 1914 in organized crime
Thomas Lynch (poet) (born 1948), American poet and undertaker
Thomas Lynch (psychiatrist) (1922–2005), Irish psychiatrist
Thomas Lynch (set designer), professor at the University of Washington School of Drama
Thomas Kerr Lynch (1818–1891), Irish explorer
Thomas R. Lynch (born 1956), American psychologist and author
Thomas W. Lynch (born 1956), American television series creator and executive producer